Félix Arnaudin (born Simon Arnaudin, 30 May 1844 – 6 December 1921) was a French poet, photographer, and specialist in Haute-Lande folklore. In Gascony, M. Arnaudin created his collection of tales by attending gatherings, as well as marriages and various agricultural festivals.  He left 3,000 photos to the Musée d'Aquitaine in Bordeaux.

Félix Arnaudin was the first to observe Haute-Lande as a native person. He was said to be a linguist, folklorist, historian, ethnologist, photographer and writer. He became famous studying the folklore of the Landes of Gascony, at that time in full economical and social transition. His work is centered on recording Gascon language fairy tales and songs; on land, habitations, shepherd and peasants photography. He, thus, consecrated his life to save this heritage from fading into oblivion. His natal house became a photo exhibit managed by the Labouheyre commune.

Biography 
His family of poor land owners settled at Labouheyre, in the Landes département, Monge district, where he was born and would die seventy-seven years later. His formation at the Mont-de-Marsan college was the foundation of an erudition precious for his works. After earning his diploma and coming back to Labouheyre, he could not find any work related with his knowledge and desires. Living from the wages of a few métairies, he did not hold any employment for long. At the age of thirty, still single, he decided to focus on his passion: to witness the shepherd culture of the Haute Lande, which would be destroyed by economical changes. Being considered an eccentric by his fellow, he was called Lou Pèc (the madman, in Gascon).

Driven by the love of his country, he gained at the same time rational and scientific manners to his research. He thus traveled Haute Lande from end to end, often on bicycle, to interrogate its inhabitants, using forms. He applied the same thoroughness to the making of inquiry notes and photo directories.

He was a pioneer in describing with photos the Haute Lande and its remarkable aspects. The result is unique for its importance (several thousands of glass plates) and its diversity, on which he made himself a great artistic operator and a rigorous observer.

He focused on collecting the entirety of the cultural fund of the "real Lande", recording tales, proverbs, songs, words of the gascon language, notes on history, archaeology and ecology of this territory. He only managed to publish a few fragments of this titan work during his lifetime in the form of three low audience publications:
 Contes Populaires (Popular Tales, 1887)
 Chants Populaires (Popular Songs, 1912)
 Choses de l’Ancienne Grande-Lande, (Things from the Ancient Grand Lande, printed a few time before his death)

However, those collections are only the result of an immense work of which several dozens of manuscripts and numerous photos are witness (Landes' shepherd on stilts, peasants in a farm, etc.).

On 30 January 1921, a few months before his own death, he wrote the following lines:
"In my poor life of savage dreamer, however anxious of our local past, I received few encouragements; indifference and mockery, a bit on all sides, willingly took their place".

Consecration 
Fans and heirs began, at the beginning of the 1960, to take interest on this legacy, of which they made new volumes, among which tales, the Gascon dictionary of the Grand Landes, two volumes of songs and proverbs, unique testimonies of this disappeared world. In 1979, all the manuscripts of Félix Arnaudin were donated by his heirs to the Parc naturel régional des Landes de Gascogne. His work have been made available, thanks to the éditions Confluences publishing of his Œuvres Complètes (complete works), in 9 volumes Gascon/French (among them a general index and a Gascon/French dictionary) made by the scientific council of the Parc naturel régional des Landes de Gascogne.

"On 6 December 1921 died, in his house at Monge in Labouheyre, a desperate man. Félix Arnaudin was sure to have failed his mission which justified his existence. We know now that he succeeded. He gave back its honour to a slandered country which without him would have been despoiled of its memory. He saved, of this country, much more than is ordinarily possible to steal from time. He won the majority of his impossible fight against death. Death would have only won the last victory: Félix Arnaudin won, but we cannot tell him."

Historical context

Félix Arnaudin came from what is now the Landes forest but, on his time, was a mosaic of forest (of oak trees and pine trees), fields, and bare moors; on which some 650,000 sheep grazed. This country was then living under a pastoralism system, which would be broken in the middle of the 19th century by forestry. The symbolic date of this revolution is the 19 June 1857 law, on the improvement of the Landes, which stimulated communes to sell or plant trees on the Common land, and ultimately signified the end of the old pastoral system in that area.

References

External links

French photographers
1844 births
1921 deaths
19th-century French poets
People from Landes (department)
20th-century French poets
French male poets
19th-century French male writers
20th-century French male writers